The 2006 Asian Cycling Championships took place at the Kuala Lumpur City Hall Velodrome, Cheras, Kuala Lumpur, Malaysia from 9 to 16 September 2006.

Medal summary

Road

Men

Women

Track

Men

Women

Medal table

References
 cyclingnews results

Asia
Asia
Cycling
Asian Cycling Championships
International cycle races hosted by Malaysia